"Smooth Sailin" is a song co-written by Curly Putman and Sonny Throckmorton. Connie Smith released this song as a single on Monument Records in 1978 that peaked at No. 68 on the U.S. Hot Country Songs list..  Throckmorton also released this song on his 1978 debut album, Last Cheater's Waltz. His version was re-released in 1979 on Mercury Records as a double-A-side with "Last Cheater's Waltz". This double-sided single peaked at number 47 on the country music charts that year.

T. G. Sheppard then covered this song on his 1980 album of the same name. Sheppard's version was the most successful and went to number six on the same chart in 1980.

Charts

Weekly charts

Year-end charts

References

1978 songs
1979 singles
1980 singles
Connie Smith songs
T. G. Sheppard songs
Sonny Throckmorton songs
Songs written by Sonny Throckmorton
Songs written by Curly Putman
Song recordings produced by Buddy Killen
Warner Records singles
Curb Records singles